Kokoro is a Yoruba word meaning "worm", "grub" or "insect".

Medicine
The term "kokoro" is used in traditional Yoruba medicine to describe tiny, invisible worms or insects that are thought to live in small bags within the body, and perform useful functions such as aiding digestion and fertility.  They are thought to also carry sexually transmitted diseases and other diseases. If they become too powerful, they must be controlled, killed or driven out by bitter-tasting medicines. If kokoro are identified with bacteria and viruses, and the small bags are identified with cells, this is consistent with modern medical views.

Wisdom
The Yoruba of Nigeria have a saying regarding the right to life of insects:
Yi ese re si apakan,ma se te kokoro nikokoro ti iwo ko naani niOlorun lo le da a
(Side step your feet do not kill that insect That insect you do not regard God also created.)

Another saying, describing communal responsibility, is:
ti ara ile ani ba nje kokoro buruku ti a ko ba kilo funkurukere re ko ni je ki a sun loru 
(If your neighbour is eating bad insect, you should caution them, or your sleep will be disturbed at night).

See also
Yoruba medicine

References

Traditional African medicine 
Yoruba words and phrases